Golra Sharif is a town situated near the Margalla Hills in Islamabad Capital Territory, Pakistan, at about  above sea level,  from the ancient city of Taxila.

It is known for the Mausoleum of Meher Ali Shah that yearly attracts thousands of devotees. Prior to the arrival of Meher Ali Shah's ancestors, Golra Sharif was a village in the suburbs of Rawalpindi.

Railway station
The Golra Sharif Junction railway station is situated on Golra Road near Golra Sharif. The station was established in 1881. It is an important junction of Pakistan Railways to link Peshawar, Kohat, Havelian, and Multan. It hosts the Railways Heritage Museum.

References 

Union councils of Islamabad Capital Territory
Ziyarat
Islamabad